Navajo Lake is a small reservoir in northwestern Kane County in southern Utah, United States. It is shallow, reaching depths of only . Recreation includes fishing, boating, swimming, and lodging facilities. Species of trout in Navajo Lake are brook trout, splake trout (hybrid), and rainbow trout. Trout survival for winter is very poor with only the splake and brook trout overwintering. There is also a dense population of Utah chub.
The lake was formed by a lava flow across the eastern end of the valley. The lake drains into both the Great Basin and the Colorado River drainage systems through sinkholes in the lake floor.

See also
 List of dams and reservoirs in Utah

References

External links

Lakes of Kane County, Utah
Lakes of Utah